Ada Cavendish (1839 – 5 October 1895) was an English actress known for her Shakespearean roles and for popularising the plays of Wilkie Collins in America .

Life
After her stage debut in August 1863, beginning in musical burlesques by F. C. Burnand and others, Cavendish became known for playing such Shakespearean heroines as Juliet, Beatrice and Rosalind. She also famously played the title role of Miss Gwilt in the stage adaptation of Armadale and Mercy Merrick in The New Magdalen, both by Wilkie Collins.

Family
She married Francis Albert Marshall (1840-1889), who published a scholarly edition of Shakespeare.

She was buried at Kensal Green Cemetery, London.

Notes

References
Peters, Catherine.  The King of Inventors, A Life of Wilkie Collins, Seeker & Warburg, London 1991

External links
Description of Cavendish
Information about Cavendish
Ada Cavendish (1839-1895) at PictureHistory.com
review in The New York Times
The New Magdalen
Photos of Cavendish
 (subscription required)

1839 births
1895 deaths
19th-century English actresses
English stage actresses